This is a list of electoral results for the electoral district of Algester in Queensland state elections.

Members for Algester

Election results

Elections in the 2020s

Elections in the 2010s

Elections in the 2000s

References

Queensland state electoral results by district